Occidozyga is a genus of frogs in the family Dicroglossidae found in southeastern Asia between eastern India, southern China, and Java. They sometimes go under the common name Java frogs or floating frogs.

Species
There are 13 species in this genus:

References

 
Amphibian genera
Amphibians of Asia
Dicroglossidae
Taxa named by Heinrich Kuhl
Taxa named by Johan Conrad van Hasselt